The Rt Hon William Campbell, Lord Skerrington (1855–1927) was a Scottish judge. He was the first Catholic judge in the country since the Reformation.

Life

The son of Robert Campbell, a magistrate in Ayrshire, he was born on 27 June 1855.

From 1905 to 1908, Campbell served as the elected Dean of the Faculty of Advocates. On 15 October 1908 he was created a Senator of the College of Justice and retained the role until 1926.

In later life, he lived at 12 Randolph Crescent in Edinburgh's West End.

He died on 21 July 1927. He is buried in St Johns Churchyard at the west end of Princes Street in Edinburgh. The grave is marked by a simple stone cross and lies in the lower section.

His biography was written by Francis Caird Inglis.

Family
He was married to Alice Mary (d.1929).

References

1855 births
1927 deaths
Scottish lawyers
Senators of the College of Justice
Scottish Roman Catholics
Deans of the Faculty of Advocates
Burials at St John's, Edinburgh